In enzymology, an aldose 1-epimerase is an enzyme that catalyzes the chemical reaction

alpha-D-glucose  beta-D-glucose

Hence, this enzyme has one substrate, alpha-D-glucose, and one product, beta-D-glucose.

This enzyme belongs to the family of isomerases, specifically those racemases and epimerases acting on carbohydrates and derivatives.  The systematic name of this enzyme class is aldose 1-epimerase. Other names in common use include mutarotase, and aldose mutarotase.  This enzyme participates in glycolysis and  gluconeogenesis.

Structural studies

References

 
 
 
 

EC 5.1.3
Enzymes of known structure